is a Japanese professional footballer who plays as a goalkeeper for Shonan Bellmare.

References

External links

1997 births
Living people
Japanese footballers
Association football goalkeepers
AC Nagano Parceiro players
Shonan Bellmare players
J3 League players